Cameron Joslin Gigandet (born August 16, 1982) is an American actor whose credits include a recurring role on The O.C. and appearances in feature films Twilight, Pandorum, Never Back Down, Burlesque, Easy A, Priest and The Magnificent Seven. He also starred in the CBS legal drama series Reckless. From 2016 to 2018, Gigandet starred in the Audience Network drama series Ice.

Early life
Gigandet was born in Tacoma, Washington, the son of Kim and Jay Gigandet, a co-owner of The Rock pizza franchise. His sister Kelsie is a hair stylist. After graduating from Auburn Senior High School in Auburn, Washington, in 2001, he moved to California, where he attended Santa Monica College.

Career
In 2003, Gigandet made his acting debut with a guest appearance in the crime television series CSI: Crime Scene Investigation. In 2004 and 2005 Gigandet continued his television career with recurring roles in television shows such as The Young and the Restless and Jack and Bobby.

In 2005-06, Gigandet was cast as Kevin Volchok on the Fox teen drama television series The O.C., appearing in 15 episodes. Gigandet portrayed the role of Kevin, a bad boy and rebellious competitive surfer who develops a casual relationship with the rich socialite Marissa Cooper, portrayed by Mischa Barton.
In August 2007, Gigandet was cast in the Summit Entertainment action drama film Never Back Down. He portrayed the role of the villainous bad boy and fighting champion Ryan McCarthy who sets out to take down the film's protagonist. Gigandet and co-star Sean Faris shared an award for "Best Fight" at the 2008 MTV Movie Awards.
In December 2007, Summit Entertainment cast Gigandet in the planned film adaptation of the best selling vampire book series Twilight by Stephenie Meyer. He signed on to portray the role of the film's "tracker" vampire James. Gigandet received his second "Best Fight" award win at the 2009 MTV Movie Awards with Robert Pattinson.

In 2008, Gigandet won the award for "One to Watch" at the 10th Annual Young Hollywood Awards. In August 2008, Gigandet signed on to the Screen Gems supernatural horror film The Unborn, portraying the role of the protagonist's love interest. Also in 2009, Gigandet starred as Corporal Gallo in the sci-fi thriller Pandorum. In 2009, Gigandet was cast alongside Leighton Meester and Minka Kelly in the thriller film The Roommate.

In 2010, Gigandet portrayed Micah, a Christian high school student, in Easy A. That same year, Gigandet starred as the villainous prison guard Chase in the psychological straight-to-DVD thriller The Experiment.
In 2010, Gigandet was cast in the film Burlesque. The film was written and directed by first-time director Steve Antin and starred Cher, Christina Aguilera and Stanley Tucci.

In 2011, Gigandet portrayed Jonah in the psychological thriller Trespass. Gigandet had a supporting role in the 2011 vampire thriller Priest.

Personal life
Gigandet married Dominique Geisendorff in 2008. They have two daughters and a son. Geisendorff filed for divorce in August 2022.

Filmography

Film

Television

Awards and nominations

References

External links
 

1982 births
Living people
American male film actors
American male television actors
Krav Maga practitioners
Male actors from Tacoma, Washington
People from Auburn, Washington
21st-century American male actors